Sweden competed at the 2015 World Championships in Athletics in Beijing, China, from 22–30 August 2015.

Results

Men
Track and road events

Field events

Women
Track and road events

Field events

Sources
 friidrott.se

Nations at the 2015 World Championships in Athletics
World Championships in Athletics
Sweden at the World Championships in Athletics